The Terhune House is located at 161 Godwin Avenue in Wyckoff, Bergen County, New Jersey, United States. The house was initially constructed in 1737, with the second major renovation occurring in 1776. Terhune family lore suggests that the family were French Huguenots who fled France in the 16th century to pursue their religious beliefs.  The family settled in Holland and after two or three generations of intermarrying within the Dutch community they set their sights on Pre-Colonial America. Albert Albertse ter Hune arrived on the shores of New Netherland (New York City) from Holland in December 1637. Arriving on the ship “Calmar Sleutel” he settled, for what would become the 1st of 15 generations of Terhunes in North America.

History
Albert Albertse ter Hune married Geertj and they had seven children. The eldest son Jan Albertse Terhune inherited the family farm near Gravesend in Long Island.

Original structure

The original structure, a stone home, with an outside cellar, and staircase that led to a loft with sleeping quarters, was constructed using Dutch home building methods prevalent at the time of construction.

Sister home

This house was originally a twin to the Van Blarcom House located just to the south.  It has been altered by the removal of the original west wall with the first addition being added (early, as the workmanship is much the same). A frame addition was added to the west of the home in 1877. The home was purchased by the Van Blarcom family in 1895.

Characteristics

Several characteristics that identify this beautiful and historic include dual fireplaces in the original house, and "Honeymoon Pines", a gift from the parents of an engaged couple who would soon occupy the home. The main pilings consist of pine tree trunks. Additions were built in 1877, 1895 and again in 1960. The original home was a gift to an engaged couple who would soon occupy the house.

See also 
 National Register of Historic Places listings in Bergen County, New Jersey

External links
 Google Street View of Terhune House

References

Houses completed in 1737
Houses in Bergen County, New Jersey
Houses on the National Register of Historic Places in New Jersey
National Register of Historic Places in Bergen County, New Jersey
Wyckoff, New Jersey
New Jersey Register of Historic Places